Hadi Sepehrzad (born 19 January 1983 in Tehran) is an Iranian decathlete.

Competition record

References
 

1983 births
Living people
Iranian decathletes
Olympic athletes of Iran
Athletes (track and field) at the 2008 Summer Olympics
Athletes (track and field) at the 2006 Asian Games
Athletes (track and field) at the 2010 Asian Games
Athletes (track and field) at the 2014 Asian Games
Iranian male athletes
Asian Games competitors for Iran